Batradz Alanovich Kokoyev (born 12 August 1995) is a Russian football player.

Career
He made his debut in the Russian Football National League for FC Alania Vladikavkaz on 7 August 2013 in a game against FC Ufa.

Personal
His father Alan Kokoyev played in the Russian Premier League for FC Okean Nakhodka.

References

External links
 

1995 births
People from Dzau District
Living people
Russian footballers
Association football defenders
Association football midfielders
FC Spartak Vladikavkaz players
FC Chernomorets Novorossiysk players
FC Khimki players
FC Volgar Astrakhan players
FC Dynamo Stavropol players
Russian First League players
Russian Second League players